Anandathandavapuram is a village in Mayiladuthurai taluk, Nagapattinam district, Tamil Nadu. The nearest town, Mayiladuthurai is located five kilometers, southerly. Anandathandavapuram has a small railway station which is located within the limits of the village. From this village there are direct trains to Chennai, Tiruchirapalli, Thanjavur, Chidambaram, Vaitheeswaran Temple etc.

The village is famous for Panchavateeswarar Shiva Temple

Etymology 
Ananda thandavam means Happy Dance. Anandathandavapuram is also known as Anathandapuram.

Demographics 

As per the 2001 census, Anandathandavapuram had a population of 3560 with 1796 males and 1764 females. The sex ratio was 982 and the literacy rate, 76.4.

Facilities 
Apart from the temples and the Railway Station they have a POST OFFICE, GOVT SCHOOL, PHARMACY with DOCTOR Consultation and GROCERIES shop at Anna statue street

Famous personalities 

The great Carnatic composer and lyricist Sri Gopalakrishna Bharathi lived in this village for most of his life. His music Guru - Sri Govinda Yati also lived here. As a tribute to this great man, a music festival in the name of Gopala Krishna Bharathi is conducted in this village annually when renowned musicians from all over the country like Sudha Raghunathan, Sanjay Subramanian come to this village and render wonderful performances on Sri Gopala Krishna Bharathi's creations.
The famous theatre artist Bombay Gnanam also grew up here.

References 

 

Villages in Thanjavur district